The 1908 Massachusetts Aggies football team represented Massachusetts Agricultural College in the 1908 college football season. The team was coached by Matthew W. Bullock and played its home games at Alumni Field in Amherst, Massachusetts. The 1908 season was Bullock's last as head coach of the Aggies. Massachusetts finished the season with a record of 3–3–3.

Schedule

References

Massachusetts
UMass Minutemen football seasons
Massachusetts Aggies football